Four in the Morning may refer to:

Songs 
 "[It's] Four in the Morning" (1971), by Faron Young
 "Four in the Morning" (1985), by Night Ranger on album 7 Wishes
 "4 in the Morning" (2006),  by Gwen Stefani

Other media 
 "Four in the Morning" (1965), film
 Four in the Morning, a Canadian TV series
  Poet John Rives's TED talk "The 4 a.m. mystery"